The Vegas Golden Knights (colloquially known as the Knights) are a professional ice hockey team based in the Las Vegas metropolitan area. They compete in the National Hockey League (NHL) as a member of the Pacific Division in the Western Conference. Founded in 2017 as an expansion team, the Golden Knights are the first major sports franchise to represent Las Vegas. The team is owned by Black Knight Sports & Entertainment, a consortium led by Bill Foley and the Maloof family. Their home games are played at T-Mobile Arena on the Las Vegas Strip in Paradise, Nevada.

One of the few expansion franchises to experience immediate success, the Golden Knights qualified for the Stanley Cup playoffs in their first four seasons and reached the Stanley Cup Finals in their first season. Their 13 playoff wins en route to the 2018 Stanley Cup Finals are the most for a team during their inaugural postseason run.

History

Background and establishment
The NHL has had a presence in Las Vegas since 1991; that year, the city hosted the first outdoor game between two NHL teams – a preseason exhibition between the Los Angeles Kings and New York Rangers outside Caesars Palace. The Kings would subsequently organize "Frozen Fury" – a series of annual preseason games in Las Vegas against the Colorado Avalanche. The NHL Awards ceremonies have been held in Las Vegas since 2009. In 2009, the media speculated about a plan involving Hollywood producer Jerry Bruckheimer to move the Phoenix Coyotes to Nevada.

Rumors of a Las Vegas expansion team surfaced again in August 2014, pointing to a new indoor arena on the Strip (built as a joint venture between Anschutz Entertainment Group, owners of the Los Angeles Kings, and MGM Resorts International) as the potential home arena, although these rumors were denied by the league. In November 2014, an unconfirmed report stated that the league had selected billionaire businessman Bill Foley and the Maloof family (former owners of the National Basketball Association's Sacramento Kings, and founders of the Palms Casino Resort) to lead the ownership group for a Las Vegas expansion team. In December 2014, the NHL's board of governors decided to allow Foley to hold a season ticket drive to gauge interest in a Las Vegas team, though league commissioner Gary Bettman also warned the media to "[not] make more out of this than it is". The season ticket drive began in February 2015, with interested parties placing ten percent deposits for the 2016–17 season. The drive drew 5,000 deposits in its first day and a half, and reached its goal of 10,000 deposits by April 2015.

In June 2015, the league officially opened the window for prospective owners to bid on expansion teams. By this point, Foley had secured more than 13,200 season-ticket deposits. Two expansion applications were submitted: Foley's application for a Las Vegas team, and a bid from Quebecor to revive the Quebec Nordiques at a new arena in Quebec City. Both Las Vegas and Quebec were invited to move into Phase II of the league expansion bid in August 2015, and subsequently advanced to Phase III.

At the league owners' meeting on June 22, 2016, in Las Vegas, the Las Vegas expansion bid was approved by a unanimous vote, with play to begin in the 2017–18 NHL season. The team became the first major professional sports franchise to be based in Las Vegas, and the first NHL expansion team since 2000. Foley committed to pay the league's $500 million expansion fee and began the process of hiring the team's principal staff and determining its official identity. Foley announced that former Washington Capitals general manager George McPhee would be the franchise's first general manager. On November 22, 2016, the name was revealed as the Vegas Golden Knights.

Start of operations (2017–present)
On March 1, 2017 (coinciding with the league's trade deadline), the team completed its expansion fee payments and filings, making it eligible to formally begin operations such as free agent acquisition, and participation in league meetings. Five days later, the Golden Knights made their first personnel move by signing Reid Duke to a three-year entry-level contract.

The team announced inaugural head coach Gerard Gallant on April 13, 2017. Over the next two months, the Golden Knights developed their farm system, announcing affiliations with the Chicago Wolves of the American Hockey League and the Quad City Mallards of the ECHL.

The team participated in the 2017 NHL Expansion Draft on June 21, 2017, selecting an available player from all 30 teams in the NHL. The draft picks were announced at T-Mobile Arena during the NHL Awards ceremony. Some notable selections included goalie Marc-Andre Fleury from the Pittsburgh Penguins and winger James Neal from the Nashville Predators. At the 2017 NHL Entry Draft, Cody Glass was the first player selected by the Golden Knights. The Golden Knights played their first game on October 6 against the Dallas Stars with Neal scoring the franchise's first two goals en route to their first victory.

The team's inaugural home game was played on October 10, 2017, hosting the Arizona Coyotes as the second game of a home-and-home series. In the aftermath of the October 1 mass shooting, the pre-game ceremonies honored the victims of the attack, and the team issued an appeal for donations to its charitable arm. With their 5–2 win, the Golden Knights increased their unbeaten streak to start the season to 3–0, an NHL record for an expansion team. The Golden Knights are the first team in NHL history to have started their inaugural season winning eight of their first nine games. During their tenth game, goaltender Oscar Dansk was injured becoming the third Golden Knights' goaltender to be injured during the season after losing starters Fleury and the recently acquired Malcolm Subban, forcing the team to start a fourth goaltender in 11 games with Maxime Lagace. Fifteen games into the season, Vadim Shipachyov became the first player to retire from the NHL as a Golden Knight when he decided to return to the Kontinental Hockey League. In December, the Golden Knights set another NHL expansion team record of six straight wins, a record they had previously missed when they lost their tenth game of the season, and established a new NHL record with eight straight wins. On February 1, 2018, the Golden Knights set the expansion team record for wins in a debut season with 34 wins after only 50 games, and then on February 21, 2018, set a record for most points by an expansion team in the inaugural season with 84. Clinching a berth for the 2018 playoffs on March 26, the Golden Knights became the first team since the Edmonton Oilers and Hartford Whalers in the 1979–80 season to make the playoffs in their inaugural season in the league. On March 31, the Knights clinched the Pacific Division title, becoming the first true expansion team in the four major sports to win its division in its inaugural season (not counting all-expansion divisions, as was the case in the 1967–68 season). They had led the Pacific since December 23, 2017.

On April 11, the franchise won its first playoff game in a 1–0 victory over the Los Angeles Kings in the first game of the series. Six days later on April 17, the franchise earned their first playoff series win against the Kings, winning the fourth game by a 1–0 score, which also became their first playoff series sweep. The Knights became the first team in NHL history to sweep their first playoff series in their inaugural season. On May 6, 2018, the Golden Knights defeated the San Jose Sharks four-games-to-two, becoming the third team in NHL history to win multiple playoff series in their inaugural season, and advanced to the Western Conference Finals. On May 20, Vegas defeated the Winnipeg Jets to win the Western Conference Finals in five games, becoming the third NHL team to advance to the Stanley Cup Finals in its inaugural season, after the Toronto Arenas in 1918 and the St. Louis Blues in 1968. The Golden Knights would lose the Stanley Cup Finals to the Washington Capitals in five games; despite this loss, the team won 13 postseason games that year, breaking the record for the most wins by an expansion team in their first playoff appearance (which was previously held by the Florida Panthers when they won 12 games in their first postseason appearance in the 1996 playoffs).

In the 2018–19 season, the Golden Knights returned to the playoffs as the third seed of the Pacific Division. They were defeated in the First Round in seven games by the San Jose Sharks.

During the 2019–20 season, the Golden Knights fired head coach Gallant and replaced him with recently fired Sharks' head coach Peter DeBoer on January 15, 2020. After earning the top seed in the Western Conference during the round robin of the Stanley Cup Qualifiers, the Golden Knights advanced to the Conference Finals before falling to the Dallas Stars in five games.

In the shortened 2020–21 season, which saw a temporary realignment where teams only played against their own division in the regular season, the Golden Knights finished second in the West Division despite being tied in points with the Colorado Avalanche due to the Golden Knights having five fewer regulation wins than the Avalanche. They defeated the Minnesota Wild and the Colorado Avalanche in the first and second rounds of the Stanley Cup playoffs, but were eliminated in the Stanley Cup Semifinals in six games by the Montreal Canadiens.

The 2021–22 season saw the Golden Knights miss the playoffs for the first time in team history, as they finished three points behind the Nashville Predators in the Western Conference.

On September 20th, 2022, Vegas announced that their Gold jerseys would take over as their Primary home jersey, as well as announcing a new center ice logo, as part of their "The Golden Age" campaign.

Team identity

Logos, colors, and uniforms

The team's primary logo is a barbute helmet, superimposed on a black and gold shield, with a V-shaped opening. The secondary logo is two crossing swords behind a red star, designed to resemble the star found on the landmark Welcome to Fabulous Las Vegas sign.

The team's primary color is steel gray, which is said to represent "strength and durability". The other team colors are gold, red (found in the Las Vegas skyline and at Red Rock Canyon), and black (for "power and intensity").

The first uniforms in Golden Knights team history were unveiled publicly on June 20, 2017. Home uniforms are steel gray with black, gold and red stripes, while road uniforms are white with steel gray, gold and red stripes. Shoulders feature the alternate swords logo. On October 2, 2020, the Golden Knights introduced a gold alternate uniform, essentially a palette swap of the road uniforms with gold and white switching places. On February 11, 2021, the Golden Knights debuted shiny gold helmets as an alternate to their home gray helmets. Starting with the 2022–23 season, the gold uniforms became the primary, while the gray uniforms became the alternate.

The Golden Knights also released a special "Reverse Retro" alternate uniform. Because the Knights did not have a long NHL history to draw from, their retro design was inspired in part by Manon Rhéaume, the first female NHL player, who played for the now-defunct International Hockey League's Las Vegas Thunder. The uniform employs a red base and features the "crossing swords" logo in front. Their second "Reverse Retro" uniform was a faux-back design from 1995, featuring a black base and a diagonal "VEGAS" wordmark inspired by various vintage hotels in the strip. The wordmark also has a glow-in-the-dark feature when shown in a dark background.

Name
The team's name includes "Knights" as a homage to the Black Knights of the United States Military Academy, Foley's alma mater, and because knights were, according to Foley, "the epitome of the warrior class". Foley had hoped to name his team the Black Knights, but dropped that plan after encountering resistance from federal officials. Foley was unable to call the team the "Vegas Knights" because the London Knights owned the "Knights" name in Canada.

"Golden" was included in the name because gold is, as Foley stated, the "No. 1 precious metal", and because Nevada is the largest gold-producing state in the country. "Las" was omitted from the team's name because, according to Foley, residents tend to refer to the city simply as "Vegas", and because a four-word name would have been too long.

The United States Army opposed the team's trademark registration because their exhibition parachute team uses the same nickname; they dropped their opposition after negotiating a trademark coexistence agreement with the team. An objection was also raised by the College of Saint Rose because its sports teams use the same name; the Vegas team's initial trademark application was denied as a result, but was later approved on appeal. The team did clear the name with Clarkson University, which also uses the name Golden Knights.

Mascot

The Golden Knights' mascot is a Gila monster named Chance. He was unveiled at the team's second home game on October 13, 2017. The team opted against using a knight for a mascot because it found that knight mascots used by other teams were not very child-friendly.

Team information

Broadcasting

Television
AT&T SportsNet Rocky Mountain is the regional television rightsholder for all Golden Knights games not broadcast nationally by ESPN or TNT. The team's designated market includes Nevada, Idaho, Montana, Utah, Wyoming, and parts of Arizona and California. Golden Knights games on AT&T SportsNet are called by former Boston Bruins radio announcer Dave Goucher on play-by-play, and Shane Hnidy, who previously worked color for the Winnipeg Jets on TSN.

Radio
The team has a three-year radio deal with Lotus Broadcasting. Lotus airs the team's games on its Fox Sports Radio affiliate, KKGK 1340/98.9. KKGK fronts a network of nine stations across Nevada, California, Arizona, and Utah.

One game a week is also aired on KENO 1460, a Spanish-language sports radio station, making the team one of only three in the NHL to offer Spanish-language broadcasts.

Minor league affiliate
On May 16, 2017, the Golden Knights entered a multi-year affiliation agreement with a minor league team, the Chicago Wolves of the American Hockey League. Like most NHL–AHL affiliation arrangements, the Golden Knights were able to transfer players to and from the Wolves. Although the Wolves were the Golden Knights affiliate, the two teams do not share the same ownership. In addition to the Wolves, the Golden Knights were affiliated with the Quad City Mallards of the ECHL for the 2017–18 season, however, the Mallards ceased operations after the one season.

On August 21, 2018, the Golden Knights entered a one-year affiliation agreement with the Fort Wayne Komets of the ECHL for the 2018–19 season.

On February 6, 2020, Spurs Sports & Entertainment announced the sale of the San Antonio Rampage franchise to the Golden Knights organization. It was later announced on February 28, that the Rampage franchise was approved to relocate to the Henderson/Las Vegas area by the AHL. On May 28, the name of the relocated franchise was revealed to be the Henderson Silver Knights, mimicking the logo style and aura of their parent club. The shield-shaped logo features a silver-colored Destrier, with eyes that are the same color gold used in the logo for the Golden Knights. The Silver Knights began play in the 2020–21 season at Orleans Arena, while Dollar Loan Center was under construction.

On May 19, 2022, the Golden Knights announced a one-year affiliation agreement with the expansion Savannah Ghost Pirates of the ECHL, through the 2022–23 season.

Season-by-season record
This is a list of the seasons completed by the Golden Knights. For the full season-by-season history, see List of Vegas Golden Knights seasons.

GP = Games played, W = Wins, L = Losses, T = Ties, OTL = Overtime Losses, Pts = Points, GF = Goals for, GA = Goals against

Players and personnel

Current roster

Team captains
 Mark Stone, 2021–present

Head coaches

 Gerard Gallant, 2017–2020
 Peter DeBoer, 2020–2022
 Bruce Cassidy, 2022–present

General managers
 George McPhee, 2016–2019
 Kelly McCrimmon, 2019–present

Other personnel
 George McPhee, 2016–present, President of hockey operations
 Vaughn Karpan, 2016–present, Director of player personnel
 Bob Lowes, 2016–present, Assistant director of player personnel

Team and league honors

Awards and trophies

Clarence S. Campbell Bowl
 2017–18

Jack Adams Award
 Gerard Gallant: 2017–18

Lady Byng Memorial Trophy
 William Karlsson: 2017–18

Mark Messier Leadership Award
 Deryk Engelland: 2017–18

NHL General Manager of the Year Award
 George McPhee: 2017–18

Vezina Trophy
 Marc-Andre Fleury: 2020–21

William M. Jennings Trophy
 Marc-Andre Fleury and Robin Lehner: 2020–21

NHL Second All-Star Team
 Marc-Andre Fleury: 2020–21

First-round draft picks

 2017: Cody Glass (6th overall), Nick Suzuki (13th overall), Erik Brannstrom (15th overall)
 2018: None
 2019: Peyton Krebs (17th overall)
 2020: Brendan Brisson (29th overall)
 2021: Zach Dean (30th overall)
 2022: None

Retired numbers
The number 58 was retired by the team on March 31, 2018, in honor of the 58 victims killed in the October 2017 Las Vegas shooting.

The team is also not able to issue the jersey number 99 to any of its players as it was retired league-wide in honor of Wayne Gretzky at the 2000 NHL All-Star Game.

Statistics and records

Regular season scoring leaders

These are the top-ten point-scorers in franchise history. Figures are updated after each completed NHL regular season.
  – current Golden Knights player

''Note: Pos = Position; GP = Games Played; G = Goals; A = Assists; Pts = Points; P/G = Points per game

Individual records
 Most goals in a season: William Karlsson, 43 (2017–18)
 Most assists in a season: David Perron, 50 (2017–18)
 Most points in a season: William Karlsson, 78 (2017–18)
 Most points in a season, defenseman: Shea Theodore, 46 (2019–20)
 Most points in a season, rookie: Alex Tuch, 37 (2017–18)
 Most penalty minutes in a season: Ryan Reaves, 74 (2018–19)
 Best +/– in a season: William Karlsson, 49 (2017–18)
 Most wins in a season: Marc-Andre Fleury, 35 (2018–19)
 Most shutouts in a season: Marc-Andre Fleury, 8 (2018–19)
 Lowest GAA in a season (minimum 30 games played): Marc-Andre Fleury, 1.98 (2020–21)
 Best SV% in a season (minimum 30 games played): Marc-Andre Fleury, .928 (2020–21)

See also

 City National Arena
Henderson Silver Knights
 List of NHL players
 List of NHL seasons
 Las Vegas Wranglers
 Las Vegas Thunder

References

External links

 

  
National Hockey League teams
Sports teams in Las Vegas
Ice hockey clubs established in 2017
Ice hockey teams in Nevada
National Hockey League in the Sun Belt
2017 establishments in Nevada
Pacific Division (NHL)